1987 was the inaugural season of the Eagle Pro Box Lacrosse League. The season began on January 10, 1987, and concluded with the championship game on March 21 of that year.

Regular season

Playoffs
1987 Eagle Pro Box Lacrosse League Playoffs

Awards

Statistics leaders

See also
 1987 in sports
 1987 Philadelphia Wings

References
1987 Archive at the Outsider's Guide to the NLL

87
Lacrosse